The Coeur d'Alene Mountains are the northwesternmost portion of the Bitterroot Range, part of the Rocky Mountains, located in northern Idaho and westernmost Montana in the Western United States.

The range is named after the Coeur d'Alene Tribe.

Several decent-sized roadless areas exist in the Montana portion of the Coeur d'Alenes. Around  of roadless country centered on  Mount Bushnell, south of Thompson Falls, provides good habitat for deer, elk, and mountain lion. This area is/was densely forested with lodgepole pine generated from the Great Fire of 1910. Thirty miles (48 km) of trails provide good hiking opportunities in this roadless area. Talus slopes, grassy parks in the highest reaches, and boggy creek bottoms characterize the landscape here in addition to the forests. Lush riparian areas are home to the Coeur d'Alene salamander and tailed frog.

Vertical relief exceeds  in less than two miles (3.2 km) from the Clark Fork River to this area's highest peaks. Several tiny alpine lakes are hidden in cirque basins on Eddy Mountain. Subalpine fir and devil's club are commonly found.

Another  are roadless around Patrick's Knob. This area contains thick forests of Douglas-fir and larch in the west and scattered trees in the east; a large and commonly seen herd of bighorn sheep winters here. An old bootlegger's cabin is located on Fourteen Mile Creek.

See also
 List of mountain ranges in Montana

Notes

Bitterroot Range
Mountain ranges of Idaho
Mountain ranges of Montana
Landforms of Sanders County, Montana
Coeur d'Alene, Idaho